Dheeran Nagar is a neighbourhood of the city of Tiruchirappalli in Tamil Nadu, India. This area adjoining Pirattiyur, Trichy.It comes under ward No. 40 of the city corporation. Dheeran Nagar which is also referred as Dheeran Chinnamalai Nagar which includes residential area and Transport Depot. It is named after one of the renowned freedom fighter Dheeran Chinnamalai. NH 45(Trichy-Dindigul) pass through Dheeran Nagar. It comprises nearly 500 to 600 families. It lies on the banks of Koraiyar river. Dheeran Nagar is well connected by roadways. Dheeran Nagar falls under Tiruchi West constituency.

Neighbourhoods and suburbs of Tiruchirappalli